Roger Haudegand (20 February 1932 – 19 May 2017) was a French basketball player. He competed in the men's tournament at the 1952 Summer Olympics and the 1956 Summer Olympics.

References

External links
 

1932 births
2017 deaths
French men's basketball players
Olympic basketball players of France
Basketball players at the 1952 Summer Olympics
Basketball players at the 1956 Summer Olympics
Place of birth missing
1954 FIBA World Championship players